Acanthobothrium soberoni is a species of parasitic onchobothriid tapeworm first found in the whiptail stingray, Dasyatis brevis, in the Gulf of California. It is relatively long and with a larger number of segments, albeit with fewer testes and an asymmetrical ovary. It also differs from its cogenerate species by its hook size and length of its hook prongs; cirrus sac size; the position of its genital pore, the number of testes columns that are anterior to the cirrus sac; as well as a number of postvaginal testes.

References

External links
WORMS

Cestoda
Parasitic helminths of fish